Tura (Toura) is a Mande language of Ivory Coast. Dialects are Naò, Boo, Yiligele, Gwéò, Wáádú, Guse.

References

Mande languages
Languages of Ivory Coast